Vigilante Terror is a 1953 American Western film directed by Lewis D. Collins and written by Sidney Theil. The film stars Wild Bill Elliott, Mary Ellen Kay, Robert Bray, I. Stanford Jolley, Henry Rowland and Myron Healey. The film was released on November 15, 1953, by Allied Artists Pictures.

Plot

Things have gotten so bad that the citizens of Pinetop have formed a vigilante committee to maintain order, but the Brewer gang continues to operate. Tack Hamlin (Wild Bill Elliott) comes to town and is soon recruited for sheriff, and he gets right to work, trying to stop both the bandits and the masked vigilantes. Turns out that Brett (Myron Healey), who owns the saloon, leads both the outlaws and the vigilantes, and is planting false evidence on others to divert suspicion from himself.

Cast           
Wild Bill Elliott as Tack Hamlin 
Mary Ellen Kay as Lucy Taylor
Robert Bray as Gene Smith
I. Stanford Jolley as Matt Taylor 
Henry Rowland as Mayor Winch
Myron Healey as Brett
George Wallace as Brewer
Fuzzy Knight as Strummer Jones
Zon Murray as Bill
Richard Avonde as Artie
Michael Colgan as Jamison
Denver Pyle as Sperry
Lee Roberts as Wilson
John James as Jed

References

External links
 

1953 films
1950s English-language films
American Western (genre) films
1953 Western (genre) films
Allied Artists films
Films directed by Lewis D. Collins
Films scored by Raoul Kraushaar
American black-and-white films
1950s American films